The Royal Wadi (known locally as Wadi Abu Hassah el-Bahari) is a necropolis in Amarna, Egypt. It is the burial place of the Ancient Egyptian royal family of Amarna, which reigned during the 18th Dynasty. The cemetery is a local parallel to the Valley of the Kings.

There has been a great deal of work to ease access to the Royal Tomb of Akhenaten, and to protect the tombs from damage by flash flooding. The wadi can now be journeyed along on a metalled road, and the tomb is protected by a covering and channels to divert water away from its entrance. The angle of the entrance and descent allows sunlight (Aten) to reach all the way down to the burial chamber, however the tomb is unfinished and had it been finished at the time, sunlight would not have been able to reach the chamber.

In the wadi itself, there are five tombs, the Royal Tomb of Akhenaten, three unfinished tombs in a side wadi, and what seems to be a cache, near to the Royal Tomb.

Royal Tomb

The Royal Tomb (Tomb 26) is the only decorated tomb, and contained the burial of the 18th Dynasty Pharaoh Akhenaten. It includes a suite of chambers for his daughters, his mother and probably Nefertiti, although she was never buried there.

Tomb 27
The next of the tombs, Tomb 27, seems to have been intended for a Royal Burial, as the doorway and entrance are of a similar size to that of the Royal Tomb. However, it was never finished and no burial material has ever been found. It may have been intended for the burial of Akhenaten's successor.

Tomb 28
This is the only finished tomb in the Wadi. It may have been used by a lesser wife of Akhenaten, perhaps Kiya and their child Baketaten (if she was their child and not a sister of Akhenaten).

Tomb 29
This tomb was plastered, but never decorated. It consists of four corridors, and in plan is similar to the suite of rooms in the Royal Tomb of Akhenaten, and may have been intended for a lesser Royal Wife.

A docket found in this tomb refers to a Year 1, so the tomb must have been open in the time of Akhenaten's successors.

References
 

Amarna tombs
Wadis of Egypt
Necropoleis